The Thanksgiving Visitor is a short story by Truman Capote originally published in the November 1967 issue of McCall's magazine, and later published as a book by Random House, Inc. in 1968.  The story takes the form of a childhood tale about a boy and his bully problem. The story has a strong moral lesson related to revenge. It is a sequel to Capote's A Christmas Memory.

Conception
The Thanksgiving Visitor was inspired by Truman Capote's childhood growing up in Alabama.  One of the main characters, Miss Sook Faulk is based directly on Truman's older cousin, Nanny Rumbley Faulk, whom Truman called "Sook".

Plot summary
The story is narrated by nine-year-old Buddy, whose older cousin is his best friend. Buddy gets stopped on the way to school every day by a bully named Odd Henderson, who pins him to the ground and rubs burrs into Buddy's head because "he's a sissy", an appellation to which Buddy admits. To stop this problem, his cousin, Miss Sook, invites Odd to her big Thanksgiving dinner. During the party, when Buddy is sulking in his bathroom cupboard, he spots Odd stealing a precious cameo. When Odd leaves the bathroom, Buddy leaves and claims in front of everyone at the family dinner that Odd has stolen the cameo. Miss Sook goes to check, and she claims that the cameo is in its place, but then Odd admits to stealing the cameo, lays it on a table, and walks out. Buddy then runs out and sulks in the barn, until the afternoon, when Miss Sook teaches him that he shouldn't have publicly humiliated Odd.

Reception and critical analysis
An aunt of Truman Capote's was hurt by the tale because she felt Capote had invented a troubled childhood.  She said "I just can't believe what Truman has made us out to be and the way he's talked about his childhood.  We were a very decent, well-off family, and he's made it to be quite another story."

Adaptation
The story was adapted for television and filmed in Alabama with Capote and many of his friends and family present as observers. The 1967 television production of The Thanksgiving Visitor earned Geraldine Page a second Emmy Award.

References
Notes

Bibliography

1967 short stories
Short stories by Truman Capote
Thanksgiving fiction
Works originally published in McCall's